Malmö FF competed in Division 2 Sydsvenska Serien for the 1923–24 season.

Players

Squad stats

|}

Club

Other information

References
 

1923-24
Association football clubs 1923–24 season
Swedish football clubs 1923–24 season